The following table indicates the party of elected officials in the United States insular area of the United States Virgin Islands:
Governor
Lieutenant Governor

The table also indicates the historical party composition in the:
Territorial Legislature
Territory delegation to the U.S. House of Representatives

For a particular year, the noted partisan composition is that which either took office during that year or which maintained the office throughout the entire year. Only changes made outside of regularly scheduled elections are noted as affecting the partisan composition during a particular year. Shading is determined by the final result of any mid-cycle changes in partisan affiliation.

See also
Politics of the United States Virgin Islands
Elections in the United States Virgin Islands
List of political parties in the United States Virgin Islands

Notes

Government of the United States Virgin Islands
Political parties in the United States Virgin Islands
Politics of the United States Virgin Islands